Conflict is the third studio album by American singer, Sy Smith. The album was officially released on April 1, 2008, in the United States.

Track listing
Conflict (This is Your Brain on Drugs)
Fly Away With Me
The Things I Do
Overthought (featuring Bilal Salaam)
The Art of You
Spies
Ain't Nobody's Bizness
Reach Down in Your Soul (featuring Wes Felton)
B-Side Love Affair
Would All The People From Compton Please Leave? (Minnie Reprise)
Star

References

Sy Smith albums
2008 albums